The Vidor Champion V is an Italian homebuilt aircraft that was designed by Giuseppe Vidor, first flying on 10 June 1995. The aircraft is supplied in the form of plans for amateur construction. It is also known as the Asso Aerei V Champion.

The Champion V was developed into the Alpi Pioneer 300, with the addition of composite skin.

Design and development
The Champion V features a cantilever low-wing, a two-seats-in-side-by-side configuration enclosed cockpit under a bubble canopy, fixed or optionally retractable tricycle landing gear and a single engine in tractor configuration.

The aircraft is made from wood, with its flying surfaces covered in doped aircraft fabric. The wings are removable in about 15 minutes for ground transport or storage.

The manufacturer estimates the construction time from the supplied kit as 1500 hours.

Operational history
By 1998 the company reported that 15 kits had been sold and three aircraft were completed and flying.

In January 2014 one example was registered in the United States with the Federal Aviation Administration.

Specifications (Champion V retractable)

References

External links

Photo of a Champion V
Champion V photo collection

Champion V
1990s Italian sport aircraft
1990s Italian civil utility aircraft
Single-engined tractor aircraft
Low-wing aircraft
Homebuilt aircraft
Aircraft first flown in 1995